Snap freezing (or cook-chill or blast freezing) is the process of rapid cooling of a substance for the purpose of preservation. It is widely used in the culinary and scientific industries.

Culinary uses
Cooked meals can be preserved by rapid freezing after cooking is complete. The main target group for these products are those with little time for cooking such as schools, prisons, and hospitals.

The process involves the cooking of meals at a central factory then rapidly chilling them for storage until they are needed. Snap frozen foods need to be packed in shallow trays to make the process more efficient. The food is cooled to a temperature under 3 degrees Celsius within 90 minutes of cooking and stored at a temperature of 0 to 3 degrees Celsius. The meals can then be transported in refrigerated transport to where the food is to be reheated and consumed when needed. 
 
The length of storage depends on the method used but is usually five days. For longer storage the food may be subjected to pasteurization after cooking.

These processes have the advantage that preparation and cooking of meals is not tied to the times when the food is to be served, enabling staff and equipment to be used more efficiently. A properly managed operation is capable of supplying high quality meals economically despite high initial equipment costs. There are potential problems; careful attention has to be paid to hygiene as there are a number of points in the process where food pathogens can gain access. This requires careful attention to both the control of the process and to staff training.

Scientific use
Snap-freeze is a term often used in scientific papers to describe a process by which a sample is very quickly lowered to temperatures below -70 °C. This is often accomplished by submerging a sample in liquid nitrogen. This prevents water from crystallising when it forms ice, and so better preserves the structure of the sample (e.g. RNA, protein, or live cells)

See also

 Flash freezing
 Blast chilling

References

Food preservation
Heating, ventilation, and air conditioning